Salvia frigida is a herbaceous perennial in the family Lamiaceae. It is native to northern Iraq, northwestern Iran, and eastern Turkey growing at  elevation. It is often found growing in Anatolia, on woodland edges, meadows, limestone slopes, and crevices. The specific epithet, frigida, refers to the cold regions where it typically grows.

This very small Salvia usually puts up one  flowering stem. The  basal leaves have long wooly hairs, with the leaves sometimes surviving mild winters. The  flowers are white or pale lilac, growing in whorls of two to six.

References

External links
IPNI record

frigida
Flora of Iran
Flora of Iraq
Flora of Turkey
Taxa named by Pierre Edmond Boissier